Hadrurus hirsutus, also known as the desert hairy scorpion, is a species of scorpion in the Hadruridae family. It was first described by Horatio C. Wood Jr. in 1863.

Distribution 
This species is endemic to the state of Baja California Sur in Mexico.

Description 
The male specimen described by Williams in 1970 measured 107.4 mm, and the female specimen measured 98.7 mm.

Taxonomy 
Hadrurus hirsutus was given the protonym Buthus hirsutus by Wood in 1863. Tamerlan Thorell placed it in the genus Hadrurus in 1876.

Original publication 
 Wood, 1863: Descriptions of new species of North American Pedipalpi. Proceedings of the Academy of Natural Sciences of Philadelphia,  (original text).

External links 
 The Scorpion Files: Jan Ove Rein, Trondheim, Norwegian University of Science and Technology

References 

Caraboctonidae
Scorpions of North America
Animals described in 1863
Fauna of the Baja California Peninsula